Sigurd Müller may refer to:

Sigurd Müller (writer) (1844–1918), Danish writer
Sigurd Müller (police chief) (1924–2011), Norwegian police chief
Sigurd Müller (wine trader) (1904–1997), Danish wine trader